Landsbergis is a Lithuanian family name. Of German origin, it is sometimes translated into Lithuanian as Žemkalnis.

Notable people with the surname include:
 Gabrielius Landsbergis-Žemkalnis (1852–1916), Lithuanian theater activist
 Vytautas Landsbergis-Žemkalnis (1893–1993), Lithuanian architect
 Vytautas Landsbergis (born 1932), Lithuanian politician, former speaker of the Seimas, member of the European Parliament
 Vytautas V. Landsbergis (born 1962), Lithuanian writer, journalist and director
 Gabrielius Landsbergis (born 1982), Lithuanian politician, member of the Seimas, former member of the European Parliament

See also
Landsberg family
Landsberg (disambiguation)

Lithuanian-language surnames